Īshān is an honorific title given to Sufi leaders in Central Asia.

Ishan may also refer to:
 Ishan, Iran (disambiguation)
 Esan people
 Ishana